Following is a list of senators of Val-de-Marne, people who have represented the department of Val-de-Marne in the Senate of France.
The department was created in 1968 during a reorganization of the former Seine-et-Oise and Seine departments.

Senators for Val-de-Marne under the French Fifth Republic:

References

Sources

 
Lists of members of the Senate (France) by department